Mizur (Myzur) is a rural locality (a settlement) in Alagirsky District of the Republic of North Ossetia–Alania, Russia, located on the Ardon River. Population:

Economy
Mining is the main occupation of the settlement's residents.

References

1829 establishments in the Russian Empire
Populated places established in 1829

Rural localities in North Ossetia–Alania